The Cartography of Jamaica is the history of surveying and creation of maps of Jamaica. A list of maps of Jamaica in chronological order is shown below.

1494–1949

1950–1979

The 1:50,000 series
Between the early 1950s and the late 1970s the UK Directorate of Overseas Surveys published several editions of a series of maps of Jamaica at the scale of 1:50,000. The following table summarises the known publication dates. Online copies can be found on Commons or at the University of Texas Libraries.

Others

1979–present

Town plans

Kingston

The 1:10,000 series
Between the early 1950s and the early 1970s the UK Directorate of Overseas Surveys published several editions of a series of maps of Kingston at the scale of 1:50,000. The following table summarises the known publication dates. Online copies can be found at the University of Texas Libraries.

Others

Montego Bay
Petrol company road maps
Esso, 1967, on reverse
Texaco, 1972, on reverse

Spanish Town
Petrol company road maps
Esso, 1967, on reverse
Texaco, 1972, on reverse

Mandeville
Petrol company road maps
Esso, 1967, on reverse
Texaco, 1972, on reverse

Bibliography

References

Maps
History of Jamaica
Jamaica
Jamaica